Middle Handley is a village in North East Derbyshire in the county of Derbyshire in England.

Location

History
Like most hamlets and villages in the area, during the 17th and 18th centuries the area was known for sickle smithing and farming.

St. John The Baptist Church, which is found in the centre of the village, dates back to 1838.

References

External links

Middle Handley maps and photographs

Villages in Derbyshire
North East Derbyshire District